North Farra also known as "Alfaraah Al Shamaliayah" الفرعة الشمالية", is a small town located in the south-west region of Saudi Arabia. It is bounded from the west side by the Valley of Nahyan, and its dame "Bdwah" that has been inaugurated in 2008. The White Horn Mountain is located on the south-east side of the town. To the east, the territory of the tribe extends to the city of Bisha.

The original people of this city are called " Al Gashaam" "آل غشام ", a branch from " Bani Bakr Tribe", "قبيلة بني بكر" .

The town is composed of a modern governmental designed districts owned uniquely by its original inhabitants as per the text of the Royal Decree.

 The Valley of Nahyan, " وادي نحيان";

See also 

 List of cities and towns in Saudi Arabia
 Regions of Saudi Arabia

References

Populated places in 'Asir Province